The 1965–66 Nationalliga A season was the 28th season of the Nationalliga A, the top level of ice hockey in Switzerland. 10 teams participated in the league, and Grasshopper-Club Zurich won the championship.

First round

Final round

External links
Championnat de Suisse 1965/66

National League (ice hockey) seasons
Swiss
1965–66 in Swiss ice hockey